Hen Azriel (born 26 June 1988) is an Israeli footballer who plays as a striker.

External links
 
 ONE profile

1988 births
Living people
Israeli footballers
Association football forwards
Beitar Jerusalem F.C. players
Hapoel Petah Tikva F.C. players
Maccabi Haifa F.C. players
Bnei Yehuda Tel Aviv F.C. players
F.C. Ashdod players
Israeli people of Moroccan-Jewish descent
Israeli Premier League players
Liga Leumit players
Footballers from Jerusalem